Albert Ortega (born 18 November 1998) is a Spanish alpine ski racer.

World Championship results

References

External links

Spanish male alpine skiers
1998 births
Living people
Competitors at the 2023 Winter World University Games
Medalists at the 2023 Winter World University Games
Universiade medalists in alpine skiing
Universiade gold medalists for Spain
21st-century Spanish people